Rupture was a hardcore punk band from Perth, Australia, that formed in the 1980s and were active until around late 2001, when vocalist Gus Chamber died. During this time they released split EP's with many bands including Brutal Truth, Dropdead, Spazz, Extortion and Antiseen as well as individual releases such as Righteous Fuck and Sex Drugs and Rupture. The line up on their 1997 release Hate Makes The World Go Round is listed as Bass - Zombo, Drums - Dick Diamond, Guitar - Stumbles, Vocals - Gus Chamber.

Partial discography

Albums
 Rupture Mass slaughter permit tape 1989  ( D Wroblewski on drums )Yeah Mate! Records 
 Rupture/Belchig Beat lp Ecocentric Records (D Wroblewski on drums )1990
 Rupture compilation lp "Traped in A tooth gear" Two Sheds Records (D wroblewski on drums) 1992
 Rupture forceps ep  7" Extune Tontrager( D Wroblewski on drums 1991)
 Corrupture (2 versions) Yeah Mate! Records 1992
 Dropdead / Rupture (8", Ltd, Spl) Highly Collectable Records 1993
 Fuck Your Life... (Cass, Comp) Yeah Mate! Records 1993
 Lust And Hate (LP) SOA Records 1994
 Elektra Complex (7", EP, Ltd, Gre) Fudgeworthy Records 1995
 Lust And Hate (CD, Album) Ecocentric Records 1995
 Sex, Drugs And Rupture (Album) (2 versions) Yeah Mate! Records ... 1995
 Brutal Truth / Rupture (7", Pic) Rhetoric Records, Deaf American Recordings 1997
 Freudstein's House (7", EP) Regurgitated Semen Records 1997
 Hate Makes The World Go Round (7") Bad Card Records 1997
 Brutal Badlands (CD, Comp) HG Fact 1999
 Cunt Of God (CD, Album) Rhetoric Records 1999
 Righteous Apes (CD, Comp, Ltd) Yeah Mate! Records 1999
 GG. Allin = God (7", EP) No Fucking Labels 2001
 Suicide Boogie / I'm The Man (7") Snapshot Records (3) 2001
 Netjajev Society System / Rupture (7") Haunted Hotel Records 2004
 Extortion / Do The Bonobo Bop! (5", Yel) Hate Ape Productions 2008
 Untitled (7", Pic) No Fucking Labels, Rescued From Life Records, Breathlike Violence 2008

Split compilation albums
 3 Way Split (Cass) I (Bringer Of Destruct... Shindy Productions 1998
 In League / Know Your Knot / Rupture 3 way 5"
 Happy Birthday Gride! (7") I (Bringer Of Destruct... Insane Society Records 2001
 "Tribute Through Butchery" EP (7", EP) Sick Of Fucken Shit Regurgitated Semen Records 2003
 Modorra / Fistula (Album) (2 versions) Shat From The Womb Plague Island Records 2008

Compilations
 Son of Bllleeeeaaauuurrrrgghhh! (7", EP, Comp, Gra) Brains Of Buds Slap A Ham Records 1992
 Reproach (8 Modern Hardcore Bands Cover Negative Approach) (7", Comp) Negative Approach Ugly Pop Records 1998
 Regurgitation (7", Comp) Saapaat Sludge Records, Bad Card Records 1999
 I Kill What I Eat (CD, Album, Comp, Ltd) The Earth Is Already D... Ecocentric Records 2007
 Revive Us Again - The Voices Of Inspiration Of A Machination World (7", EP, Comp) My God Can Do Anything Machination Records

Unofficial releases
 Bllleeeeaaauuurrrrgghhh! - The CD (CD, Comp) Brains Of Buds Goatsucker Records 2003
 Split (Lathe, 6") Head Full Of Junk Not On Label

Other split LPs
 Rupture / Beltching Beet Ecocentric Records

Other split EPs
 Rupture / The Scroungers
 Rupture / Mob 48
 Rupture / Bristning
 Rupture / Senseless Apocalypse
 Rupture / Spazz
 Rupture / Slavestate
 Rupture / Masskontroll
 Rupture / Flächenbrand
 Rupture / Stupid Babies Go Mad
 Dropdead / Rupture
 Rupture / Netjajev SS
 Unborn-SF / Rupture
 ANTiSEEN / Rupture
 Skrupel / Rupture
 Rupture / The Nerds
 Rupture / Nihilistics
 Rupture / Cripple Bastards
 Rupture / Straight Edge Kegger
 Rupture / Opposition Party
 Extortion / Rupture
 Rupture / Jewman Pregnant

References
  * https://davroswroblewski.bandcamp.com/
  * https://soundcloud.com/fod-pro

Western Australian musical groups
Australian hardcore punk groups